Gregory Keith Burdine (May 1, 1959 – December 13, 2020) was an American politician who served as a Democratic member of the Alabama House of Representatives, representing the 1st District from 2010 to 2014. He was elected on November 2, 2010, and served one term.

Burdine earned his BS in Finance from the University of North Alabama in 1982. He went on to receive his JD from Cumberland School of Law in 1988. Burdine was a Finance Officer from 1982 to 1985. He was a partner in the law firm of Suttle, Mitchell, & Burdine since 1989.

He died on December 13, 2020, in Florence, Alabama, at age 61.

Committee assignments
Burdine served on the following Alabama House of Representatives committees:
 Insurance Committee
 Judiciary Committee
 Local Legislation Committee

Elections

2010

Burdine defeated Hermon T. Graham and Candy Haddock in the June 1 primary. He then defeated Quinton Hanson in the November 2 general election.

References

External links
 Project Vote Smart Biography
 List of Democratic candidates certified for the June 1, 2010 primary in Alabama
 The Wetumpka Herald, Senate, House elections will be critical

1959 births
2020 deaths
Alabama lawyers
American chief financial officers
Cumberland School of Law alumni
Democratic Party members of the Alabama House of Representatives
Politicians from Florence, Alabama
School board members in Alabama
University of North Alabama alumni